The Roman Catholic Diocese of Leeds is a Catholic diocese of the Latin Rite centred on Leeds Cathedral in the city of Leeds in West Yorkshire, England. It was founded on 20 December 1878, with the splitting of the Diocese of Beverley, which had covered all of Yorkshire. The Diocese of Leeds was made to cover the historic West Riding of Yorkshire, while the Diocese of Middlesbrough took over the organisation of the rest of Yorkshire.

History

In the 19th century, the region covered by the modern diocese fell under the jurisdiction of Vicar Apostolic of the Northern District, which in turn became the Apostolic Vicariate of the Yorkshire District, which was then elevated to the distinction of Diocese of Beverley in 1850. Around 1861, the then Bishop of Beverley, Robert Cornthwaite, informed the Holy See that in his opinion, the Diocese of Beverley was too large, and in light of the expanding Catholic population, should be sub-divided into two regions. After 15 years of discussion and planning, it was agreed that on 20 December 1878, the Diocese of Beverley be dissolved and that the Diocese of Leeds be created to cater for the West Riding of Yorkshire and those parishes in the City of York to the south of the River Ouse, and the Diocese of Middlesbrough, covering the North and East Ridings of Yorkshire and those parishes in the City of York to the north of the River Ouse. However, in 1982 the two York parishes south of the River Ouse were ceded to the Diocese of Middlesbrough to unite the City of York under one bishop. In 1980, fifty parishes in the South Yorkshire region of the diocese were transferred from Leeds to the newly formed Diocese of Hallam. The parish of Howden was transferred from the Middlesbrough diocese to the Leeds diocese in 2004.

Patronal Feasts of the Diocese

Bishops

Ordinaries
See Diocese of Beverley for bishops of that diocese.

 Robert Cornthwaite: Translated Bishop of Leeds, 20 December 1878 – died 16 June 1890.
 William Gordon:  16 June 1890 – died 7 June 1911.
 Joseph Robert Cowgill: 7 June 1911 – died 12 May 1936.
 Henry John Poskitt: 21 September 1936 – died 19 February 1950.
 John Carmel Heenan: Consecrated Bishop of Leeds 12 March 1951 – translated to Archdiocese of Liverpool, in 1957; future Cardinal.
 George Patrick Dwyer: Consecrated Bishop of Leeds by John Carmel Heenan, Archbishop of Liverpool, 24 September 1957 – translated to Archdiocese of Birmingham, in 1965.
 Gordon Wheeler: Installed as Bishop of Leeds on 27 June 1966 – retired 10 September 1985.
 David Konstant: Appointed Bishop of Leeds on 23 July 1985; installed as Bishop of Leeds on 25 September 1985 – retired 7 April 2004 and died 9 October 2016.
 Arthur Roche: Appointed Coadjutor bishop on 16 July 2002 with the Right of Succession. Installed as the 9th Bishop of Leeds on 7 April 2004 upon Konstant's retirement – left office on 26 June 2012 when he was appointed as Secretary, and later Prefect of the Congregation for Divine Worship and the Discipline of the Sacraments by Pope Benedict XVI, with the title Archbishop, Bishop emeritus of Leeds. He remained in Leeds as Apostolic Administrator until 27 September 2012 when he left for Rome.
 Marcus Stock: Named on 15 September 2014; installed as Bishop of Leeds on 13 November 2014.

Coadjutor Bishops
Joseph Robert Cowgill (1905-1911)
William Gordon (1889-1890)
Arthur Roche (2002-2004)

Auxiliary Bishop
Gerald Moverley (1967-1980), appointed Bishop of Hallam

Other priests of this diocese who became bishops
Arthur Hinsley (priest here, 1893-1905), appointed titular bishop in 1926; future Cardinal
Richard Lacy, appointed Bishop of Middlesbrough in 1879
Thomas Kevin O'Brien, appointed auxiliary bishop of Middlesbrough in 1981
Arthur Grange Riddell, appointed Bishop of Northampton in 1880
Thomas Shine, appointed auxiliary bishop of Middlesbrough in 1921
John Wilson, appointed auxiliary bishop of Westminster in 2015 - later Archbishop of Southwark
Philip Moger, appointed auxiliary bishop of Southwark in 2022

Diocesan structure

The diocese is organised into deaneries, each with a Dean and a number of parishes.

References

External links
Official Site
The Latin Mass Society in the Catholic Diocese of Leeds
GCatholic.org

 
Leeds
Christianity in West Yorkshire
Christianity in North Yorkshire
Christianity in Yorkshire
Leeds
Roman Catholic Ecclesiastical Province of Liverpool